Rivadavia is a partido in the northwest of Buenos Aires Province, Argentina, on the border with La Pampa Province.

The partido, created in 1910, has the town of América as its capital, and its main economic activities are cattle, and the cultivation of wheat, maize and soya beans.

Name

The partido is named in honour of Bernardino Rivadavia, a veteran of the Argentine War of Independence and President of Argentina 1826–1827.

Towns and Villages
América (capital, or cabecera, population 10,361)
Badano
Cerrito
Condarco
Fortín Olavarría (population 1.005)
González Moreno (population 1,663)
Mira Pampa (population 54)
Roosevelt (population 288)
San Mauricio (population 28)
Sansinena (population 468)
Sumblad (population 96)
Vadano
Valentín Gómez
Villa Sena

External links

 
América Digital - portal (Spanish)

1910 establishments in Argentina
Partidos of Buenos Aires Province